Folklore of Finland refers to  traditional and folk practices, technologies, beliefs, knowledge, attitudes and habits in Finland. Finnish folk tradition includes in a broad sense all Finnish traditional folk culture. Folklore is not new, commercial or foreign contemporary culture, or the so-called "high culture". In particular, rural traditions have been considered in Finland as folklore.

According to a well-known essay by Alan Dundes folklore includes at least the folk stories and other verbal tradition, music, traditional objects and buildings, religion and beliefs, as well as culinary tradition.

Oral tradition has been passed from generation to generation. It includes fairy tales, folk wisdom, proverbs and  poetry. Poetry in Kalevala metre has been easy to remember because of its rolling metre, repeating sections and alliteration.

Folk poetry collection trips, starting from the 19th century, have resulted in the world's largest folk poetry archive, which is a card index of about 2.2 million cards. These collection trips were funded by the Finnish Literature Society.  It sponsored among other the ten trips by Elias Lönnrot. He edited the poems he and others had collected to national epos Kalevala and Kanteletar, and published  collections of Finnish  fairy tales and riddles.

Joulupukki  is a Finnish Christmas figure. The name "Joulupukki" literally means "Christmas goat" or "Yule Goat" in Finnish; the word pukki comes from the Teutonic root bock, which is a cognate of the English "buck", "Puck", and means "billy-goat". An old Scandinavian custom, the figure eventually became more or less conflated with Santa Claus.

Living sauna culture still includes many ancient traditions. Tradition of communal work, talkoo is also living strong.

Finnish foods often use wholemeal products (rye, barley, oats) and berries (such as blueberries, lingonberries, cloudberries, and sea buckthorn).  Milk and its derivatives like buttermilk are commonly used as food, drink or in various recipes.  Various turnips were common in traditional cooking, but were replaced with the potato after its introduction in the 18th century.

References 

Finnish folklore